Matěj Stránský (born 11 July 1993) is a Czech professional ice hockey player currently under contract with HC Davos of the National League (NL) and the Czech national team.

Playing career
He was drafted 165th overall in the 2011 NHL Entry Draft by the Dallas Stars and signed an entry-level contract on 3 April 2012, and represented the Czech Republic at the 2021 and 2022 IIHF World Championship, where he won a bronze medal.

Family
His grandfather is the Czechoslovak ice hockey player Vladimír Stránský while his uncle Vladan represented Australia after playing there for several years; younger brother  is also a Czech international.

Career statistics

Regular season and playoffs

International

References

External links

1993 births
Living people
Czech expatriate ice hockey players in Switzerland
Czech expatriate ice hockey players in Canada
Czech expatriate ice hockey players in Russia
Czech expatriate ice hockey players in Sweden
Czech expatriate ice hockey players in the United States
Czech ice hockey left wingers
Czech ice hockey right wingers
Dallas Stars draft picks
HC Davos players
HC Oceláři Třinec players
Mora IK players
Saskatoon Blades players
Severstal Cherepovets players
Sportspeople from Ostrava
Texas Stars players
Ice hockey players at the 2022 Winter Olympics
Olympic ice hockey players of the Czech Republic